The Supreme Military Support Command is a corps-level military command of the Hellenic Army that provides support for its formations and units.

Structure

Base Support Command (ΔΥΒ), based at Athens.
Support Division (ΜΕΡΥΠ), based at Thessaloniki
Strategic Transport Unit (Συγκρότημα Στρατηγικών Μεταφορών), based at Assiros, Macedonia
4th Support Brigade (4η ΤΑΞΥΠ), based at Xanthi, Thrace 
651 Army Material Depot (651 ΑΒΥΠ), based at Agios Stefanos, Attica 
Military Factories Command (ΔΙΣΕ), based at Athens, Attica divided in 
301st Base Factory (301 ΕΒ), based at Agioi Anargyroi, Attica 
303rd Base Factory (303 ΠΕΒ), based at Larissa, Thessaly 
304th Base Factory (304 ΠΕΒ), based at Velestino, Thessaly 
306th Telecommunications Depot Maintenance (306 EBT), based at Acharnes, Attica
308th Base Factory (308 ΠΕΒ), based at Thessaloniki, Macedonia
700 Military Factory (700 ΣΕ), based at Keratsini, Attica 
4th Infantry Division, based at Tripoli, Arcadia
2/39 Evzone Regiment, based at Messologi.
11th Infantry Regiment, based at Tripoli
Communications Corps Training Centre (ΚΕΔΒ), based at Haidari
Engineer Corps Training Centre (ΚΕΜΧ), based at Patras	
Supply-Transport Corps Training Centre (ΚΕΕΜ), based at Sparta
Telecommunications Technicians Training School (ΣΕΤΤΗΛ), based at Pyrgos
Military hospitals
401st Athens Army General Hospital (401 ΓΣΝΑ) at Athens
411th Army General Hospital (411 ΓΣΝ)
417th Army Pension Fund Hospital (417 ΝΙΜΤΣ)
414th Army Special Diseases Hospital (414 ΣΝΕΝ) at Penteli
424th Army General Training Hospital (424 ΓΣΝΕ)

External links
 Official website (in Greek)

Military units and formations of the Hellenic Army
Military logistics units and formations